Cloyd Island is a rocky Antarctic island,  long, between Ford and Herring Islands in the south part of the Windmill Islands off the Budd Coast. It was first mapped from aerial photographs taken by USN Operation Highjump and Operation Windmill, 1947–1948. Named by the US-ACAN for J. R. Cloyd, Army Transport Service observer with Operation Windmill which established astronomical control stations in the area in January 1948.

See also
 Composite Antarctic Gazetteer
 List of Antarctic and sub-Antarctic islands
 List of Antarctic islands south of 60° S
 SCAR
 Territorial claims in Antarctica

References

External links 

Windmill Islands